Pinapaka Assembly constituency is a ST reserved constituency of Telangana Legislative Assembly, India. It is one of 5 constituencies in Bhadradri Kothagudem district. It is part of Mahabubabad Lok Sabha constituency .

Rega Kantha Rao, of Telangana Rashtra Samithi in Telangana Legislative Assembly is representing the constituency.

Mandals
The Assembly Constituency presently comprises the following Mandals:

Members of Legislative Assembly Pinapaka

Election results

Telangana Legislative Assembly election, 2018

Telangana Legislative Assembly election, 2014

See also
 List of constituencies of Telangana Legislative Assembly

References

Assembly constituencies of Telangana
Bhadradri Kothagudem district